William Moulton Ingraham (1870 – October 13, 1951) was an American politician from Portland, Maine who served most notably as Assistant Secretary of War for one year from 1916.

Biography
Ingraham was a graduate of Bowdoin College in the class of 1895.

In 1907 he was appointed Judge of Probate, a position he held for two terms.

A Democrat, Ingraham was elected Mayor of Portland in December 1915. He served one term in that position and was replaced the following year by Republican Wilford G. Chapman. He was then appointed United States Assistant Secretary of War from 1916 to 1917 in the Woodrow Wilson administration. His federal service coincided with that of Franklin D. Roosevelt while the latter was Assistant Secretary of the Navy.

He served as Collector of Port from 1917 to 1922, after which he returned to practicing law. Ingraham was a delegate to the Democratic National Convention in 1928.

Ingraham was born in 1870 to Ella Moulton and Darius H. Ingraham. His father served as payor of Portland from 1891 to 1893. He died on October 13, 1951.

References

1870 births
1951 deaths
Mayors of Portland, Maine
United States Assistant Secretaries of War
Bowdoin College alumni
Woodrow Wilson administration cabinet members